Ohio Township is a township in Franklin County, Kansas, USA.  As of the 2000 census, its population was 783.

Geography

The stream of Payne Creek runs through this township.

Transportation
Ohio Township contains one airport or landing strip, Cochran Airport.

References
 USGS Geographic Names Information System (GNIS)

External links
 US-Counties.com
 City-Data.com

Townships in Franklin County, Kansas
Townships in Kansas